MyG Digital is an Indian mobile phone retailer based in Kozhikode founded in 2006. Currently they have multiple stores in Kerala, including Kozhikode, Kottayam and Palakkad. myg.in is their own online shopping marketplace.

References 

Retail companies of India
Indian brands
Retail companies established in 2006
Online retailers of India